Bannalec (French: Gare de Bannalec) is a railway station in Bannalec, Finistère, France. The station was opened on 8 September 1863, and is located at kilometric point (KP) 653.987 on the Savenay–Landerneau railway. Today, the station is served by TER Bretagne services operated by the SNCF.

History 
The construction of a railway station in Bannalec was realized by the Compagnie du chemin de fer de Paris à Orléans in the early 1860s. The station was inaugurated on 7 September 1863, alongside those from Lorient to Quimper. Normal train operations by the Compagnie du chemin de fer de Paris à Orléans commenced the next day.

The station consists of a passenger building constructed by the French architect Phidias Vestier.

In 2018, the SNCF recorded 22 562 passenger movements through the station.

Train services
The following services currently call at Bannalec:
local services (TER Bretagne) Quimper - Quimperlé - Lorient - Vannes

Gallery

References

TER Bretagne
Railway stations in France opened in 1863
Railway stations in Finistère